Kenneth Ellis (22 January 1928 – 25 July 2003) was a Welsh amateur footballer who played as a winger in the Football League for Chester and Wrexham. He also played for Welsh club Flint Town United.

Notes

References

1928 births
2003 deaths
People from Buckley, Flintshire
Sportspeople from Flintshire
Welsh footballers
Association football wingers
Chester City F.C. players
Wrexham A.F.C. players
Flint Town United F.C. players
English Football League players